Antonio Luiz Braga was born in Herculândia, Brazil.

He graduated with a bachelor's degree in chemistry from the Federal University of São Carlos in 1981, master's degree in Organic Chemistry from the University of São Paulo in 1984, and a Ph.D. in Organic Chemistry from the University of São Paulo in 1989 under the guidance of Professor Comasseto.

He was Professor of Chemistry at the Federal University of Santa Maria (1985-2008). He was coordinator of the Chemistry Committee of FAPERGS (2000-2001). He was coordinator of a Center of Excellence project (PRONEX-2005 -.. Support Center for Bio-Organic Organocalcogênios, He was General secretary of the 11th Brazilian Meeting on Organic Synthesis (11th BMOS, 2005). Currently, he is a professor at the Federal University of Santa Catarina, Chemistry Department. He has experience in Organic synthesis, acting on the following topics: Green Chemistry, Asymmetric Catalysis, organoselenium bioactive molecules and selenium and tellurium derived amino acids and other natural products, Synthesis of the seleno-enzyme glutathione peroxidase mimetic. Coordinates CT_Infra projects at UFSC; published over 240 papers in journals recognized by the community, cited by 6400 research articles, H level:.. 42, deposited 8 patents (USA, Brazil). Award: researcher Featured in Chemistry, FAPERGS, 2007.

In 2009 he was elected member in the advisory board of the International Conference on the Chemistry of Selenium and Tellurium (ICCST). A member of the CNPq Chemistry Committee between 2009 - 2011 (CA Coordinator between 2009 and 2010). Designated and elected member of the Brazilian Academy of Sciences (ABC). In 2014 he was elected to the advisory board of the Brazilian Chemical Society (SBQ).

References

1958 births
Living people
People from Florianópolis
Brazilian chemists
Members of the Brazilian Academy of Sciences